Mapoch is a town in Dr JS Moroka Local Municipality in the Mpumalanga province of South Africa.

Mapoch is a rural village, and the local community still lives in a traditional village manner.

References

Populated places in the Dr JS Moroka Local Municipality